The  is a dam in the city of Hida,  Gifu Prefecture, Japan located on  the Takahara River, part of the Jinzū River system.  The dam is a concrete gravity dam with a height of 56 meters, and is operated by the Hokuriku Electric Power Company. The reservoir created is used by hydroelectric power generation for a total of  56,900 kW. The dam was completed in 1963.

References 

Dams in Gifu Prefecture
Dams completed in 1963
Hida, Gifu
Hydroelectric power stations in Japan
Gravity dams
Energy infrastructure completed in 1963